Pohronský Bukovec is a village and municipality in Banská Bystrica District in the Banská Bystrica Region of central Slovakia.

History
In historical records the village was first mentioned in 1563.

Geography
The municipality lies at an altitude of 530 metres and covers an area of 14.771 km2. It had a population of 105 people on 31 December 2013.

References

External links
 http://en.e-obce.sk/obec/pohronskybukovec/pohronsky-bukovec.html

Villages and municipalities in Banská Bystrica District